The 2019 NBA Summer League was held at the Thomas and Mack Center and Cox Pavilion in Las Vegas, Nevada on the campus of University of Nevada, Las Vegas. It began on July 5 and ended on July 15. All 30 teams and two national teams, China and Croatia, participated. Teams competed in a tournament-style schedule in four preliminary games before seeding in a tournament; each team played at least five games and some teams played seven. The event concluded with the 2019 NBA Summer League Championship game on July 15.

California Classic
The California Classic is an official summer league of the NBA. Six games were played from July 1 to 3, 2019, at the Golden 1 Center.

Teams
Miami Heat
Golden State Warriors
Los Angeles Lakers
Sacramento Kings

Day 1

Day 2

Day 3

Standings/seedings

Statistical leaders
Reference:

Points

Rebounds

Assists

Utah Jazz Summer League
The Utah Jazz Summer League is an official summer league of the NBA. Six games were played from July 1 to 3, 2019, at the Vivint Smart Home Arena.

Teams
Cleveland Cavaliers
Memphis Grizzlies
San Antonio Spurs
Utah Jazz

Utah Schedule
All times are in Mountain Daylight Time (UTC–6)

Day 1

Day 2

Day 3

Standings/seedings

Statistical leaders
Reference:

Points

Rebounds

Assists

Las Vegas NBA Summer League
The Las Vegas NBA Summer League is an official summer league of the NBA. 83 games will be played from July 5 to 15, 2019, across two venues, the Thomas & Mack Center and Cox Pavilion, both located in Paradise, Nevada (near Las Vegas). Both the Chinese and Croatian men's basketball teams participated in the 2019 Las Vegas Summer League.

Teams
Atlanta Hawks
Boston Celtics
Brooklyn Nets
Chicago Bulls
China
Cleveland Cavaliers
Charlotte Hornets
Croatia
Dallas Mavericks
Detroit Pistons
Denver Nuggets
Golden State Warriors
Houston Rockets
Indiana Pacers
Los Angeles Clippers
Los Angeles Lakers
Memphis Grizzlies
Miami Heat
Milwaukee Bucks
Minnesota Timberwolves
New Orleans Pelicans
New York Knicks
Oklahoma City Thunder
Orlando Magic
Philadelphia 76ers
Phoenix Suns
Portland Trail Blazers
Sacramento Kings
San Antonio Spurs
Toronto Raptors
Utah Jazz
Washington Wizards

Day 1

Day 2

Day 3

Day 4

Day 5

Day 6

Day 7

Standings/seedings

Bracket

Consolation Round

Quarterfinals

Semifinals

Championship

Statistical leaders
Reference:

Points

Rebounds

Assists

References

External links
2019 NBA Summer League - NBA.com

Summer League
2019
2019–20 in American basketball by league
2019 in sports in Nevada
July 2019 sports events in the United States